Ali Tayebnia (born 5 April 1960) is an Iranian academic, economist and former minister of finance. He was designated by President Hassan Rouhani for the position of finance minister on 4 August 2013 and was confirmed by the parliament on 15 August. He left the office on 20 August 2017.

Early life and education
Tayebnia was born in Isfahan in 1960. He received his BA (1986) and MA (1989) in theoretical economics, and his PhD (1994) in economics, all from the University of Tehran and first in each class. As part of Tayebnia's doctoral studies, he spent a year studying at the London School of Economics under the supervision of Laurence Harris.

Career

Tayebnia is an academic and has served in various state education institutions delivering courses on economy and finance. He was a faculty member at his alma mater, the University of Tehran. His field of interest is public economics.

He was the secretary of the economic commission from 1997 to 2000. He served as the deputy head of the Presidential Office for planning under the President Mohammad Khatami from 2001 to 2005. Then he was again named the secretary of the economic commission in 2005, and his tenure lasted until 2007.

He was a representative of and an advisor to Mohammad Reza Aref during the 2013 presidential elections. He was also Aref's economic advisor.

On 15 August, the Majlis approved him as minister, giving 274 votes for and 7 votes against. He was given the highest votes for with the rate of 96.5% which was also all-time record for Iranian confirmation process.

Views
Financial Times described Tayebnia as a reform-minded academic in August 2013.

Recognition
Tayebnia is the recipient of the Lee Kuan Yew Prize which was awarded to him in 2017.

References

External links

21st-century Iranian politicians
1960 births
Alumni of the London School of Economics
Finance ministers of Iran
Iranian economists
Living people
Politicians from Isfahan
University of Tehran alumni
Academic staff of the University of Tehran